Big Sister may refer to:

An older sister, see birth order
Big Sister (brothel), an online brothel in Prague
"The Big Sister" (Dexter's Laboratory), an episode of Dexter's Laboratory
"Big Sister," a song by Elvis Costello and the Attractions from Trust
Big Sister's Island, one of the Sisters' Islands of Singapore
Big Sisters, part of the Big Brothers, Big Sisters program
Big Sister (radio), a United States radio soap opera
Big Sister, an enemy type in the game BioShock 2
Big Sis, a nickname for Secretary of Homeland Security Janet Napolitano
The Big Sister (film), a lost 1916 American drama silent film
Big Sister (foods), a brand of fruit cake and other baked goods in Australia

See also

 Grande Soeur, Seychelles; an island
 
 
 
 Big (disambiguation)
 Sister (disambiguation)
 Little Sister (disambiguation) 
 Big Brother (disambiguation)